Wang Min may refer to:

Wang Min (born 1950), former Communist Party Secretary of Liaoning Province, China
Wang Min (born 1956), politician from Shandong Province and former Party Secretary of Jinan, investigated for corruption
Wang Min (handballer) (born 1980), Chinese handball player
Wang Min (rower) (born 1990), Chinese rower

See also
Wangmin Township (王民乡), a township in Xiji County, Ningxia, China
Min Kingdom (907/909–945), a Five Dynasties period state ruled by the Wang family, infrequently referred to as Wang Min (王閩)
Wang Ming (1904–1974), Chinese Communist leader